Gentianella quinquefolia, commonly called agueweed, is a flowering plant in the gentian family. It is native to eastern North America.

Subspecies
There are two subspecies:
Gentianella quinquefolia ssp. occidentalis - a more western variety, with larger flowers. Found in dry calcareous areas.
Gentianella quinquefolia ssp. quinquefolia - primarily Appalachian, with smaller flowers. Found in forests and Appalachian balds.

References

External links
Plants For A Future:Gentianella quinquefolia

quinquefolia
Medicinal plants
Plants described in 1753
Taxa named by Carl Linnaeus